Conopobathra gravissima is a moth of the family Gracillariidae. It is known from India, Indonesia (Java), Malaysia (Selangor), the Bismarck Archipelago, Thailand, South Africa, Kenya, Namibia and Zimbabwe.

The larvae feed on Bauhinia species, including Bauhinia variegata. They probably mine the leaves of their host plant.

References

Gracillariinae
Moths of Africa
Moths described in 1912